Chester Floyd Buchanan Jr. (August 10, 1907 – August 8, 1964) was an American Negro league pitcher in the 1930s and 1940s. 

A native of Philadelphia, Pennsylvania, Buchanan made his Negro leagues debut with the Philadelphia Stars. He played for the Bacharach Giants in 1936, but was back with the Stars for a five-year stretch from 1940 to 1944. He served in the US Navy during World War II. Buchanan died in New York, New York in 1964 at age 56.

References

External links
 and Baseball-Reference Black Baseball stats and Seamheads

1907 births
1964 deaths
Bacharach Giants players
Philadelphia Stars players
Baseball players from Philadelphia
African Americans in World War II
United States Navy personnel of World War II
Baseball pitchers
Burials at Long Island National Cemetery